The following is a list of notable events and releases of the year 2018 in Swedish music.

Events

January
 28 – The Gustav Lundgren Trio performed a tribute to Django Reinhardt at Stockholm Concert Hall.

February
 3 – Melodifestivalen 2018 Semi-final 1 in Löfbergs Arena, Karlstad
 10 – Melodifestivalen 2018 Semi-final 2 in Scandinavium, Göteborg
 17 – Melodifestivalen 2018 Semi-final 3 in Malmö Arena, Malmö
 24 – Melodifestivalen 2018 Semi-final 4 in Fjällräven Center, Örnsköldsvik

March
 3 – Melodifestivalen 2018 Second chance in Kristianstad Arena, Kristianstad
 10 – Melodifestivalen 2018 Final in Friends Arena, Stockholm
 16 – The Blue House Youth Jazz Festival started in Stockholm (March 16 – 18).

April
 27 – ABBA announce that they have recorded some new songs, the first since 1983.

May

June 
 6 – The 26th Sweden Rock Festival started in Norje (June 6 – 9).

July
 25 – The Norberg Festival opened (July 25 – 29).

 27 – The Uppsala Reggae Festival started (July 27 – 28).

August
 10
 The Way Out West Festival started in Gothenburg (August 10 – 12).
 The Malmöfestivalen opened in Malmö (August 10 – 17).

September

October 
 21 – The 50th Umeå Jazz Festival start (October 21 – 26).

November

December

Albums released

January

February

March

April

May

June

July

August

September

October

Deaths 

 January
 16 – Javiera Muñoz, singer (born 1977).

 February

 March
 3 — Kenneth Gärdestad, pop songwriter (born 1948).
 5 — Kjerstin Dellert, opera singer (born 1925) 
 26 – Jerry Williams, actor and rock singer (born 1942).

 April
 3 – Lill-Babs or Barbro Svensson, singer and actress (born 1938).
 20 – Avicii or Tim Bergling, Swedish DJ and record producer (born 1989)

 May

 June
 26 – Bo Nilsson, composer (born 1937).

 July
 9 – Stefan Demert, singer and songwriter (born 1939).

 August

 September
 9 – Frank Andersson, entertainer and wrestler, complications during heart surgery (born 1956).

See also 
 2018 in Sweden
 Music of Sweden
 Sweden in the Eurovision Song Contest 2018
 List of number-one singles and albums in Sweden (see 2018 section on page)

References

 
Swedish music by year
Swedish
Music